Kumi may refer to:

 Kumi (name), a Japanese name
 Kumi District, a district in eastern Uganda
 Kumi Town, a town in eastern Uganda
 Kumi University
 Kumi Kumi, an illegal liquor brewed in Kenya
 Kumi Lizard, a reptile that allegedly once lived in New Zealand
 Kumi odori, a form of Ryukyuan dance
 KUMI 415, a prison gang in the San Francisco Bay Area
 KUMI (FM), a defunct radio station (89.9 FM) formerly licensed to serve Ramona, California, U.S.
 KWPL-LD, a television station in Santa Fe, New Mexico, U.S., which held the call sign KUMI-LD in 2016

See also
 Kumis is a fermented dairy product traditionally made from mare milk or donkey milk. 
 
 Gumi (disambiguation)